Spirit bear refers to any white-coated (leucistic) American black bear. It also specifically refers to the Kermode bear, a subspecies of American black bear in coastal British Columbia, which has a high prevalence of white-coated bears.

It can also refer to:

 Spirit Bear: The Simon Jackson Story, a 2005 Canadian film
 Touching Spirit Bear, a children's book by Ben Mikaelsen

See also

 Bear worship